The job of an ash burner or potash burner (Pottaschbrenner) was to burn wood for industrial purposes. From the ashes, the potash needed in dyeing, in soapmaking and in glassmaking could be made by leaching and boiling (hence the term "potash boiler" or Pottaschsieder).

Historically potash was also used as a fertiliser, in the manufacture of gunpowder and in the household as a detergent, bleach and baking aid.

As forests increasingly dwindled and when, in the 12th century the cutting and burning of wood was limited or banned, ash burners collected dead wood from the forests as well as fireplace ash from homes.

Towards the end of the 19th century the occupation of ash burner declined with the increasing importance of coal and improved means of transport through the railways. Potash as an industrial raw material was replaced by potassium minerals obtained by mining.

Contemporary witness, teacher and local historian, Lukas Grünenwald, recorded the recollections from his youth in Dernbach in the Palatinate region:

References 

History of forestry
Forestry occupations
Obsolete occupations